[[The Hobbit (film series)|The Hobbit film series']] is a series of epic fantasy-drama films directed by Peter Jackson. The three films, entitled An Unexpected Journey, The Desolation of Smaug, and The Battle of the Five Armies, are released worldwide in 2012, 2013 and 2014, respectively. They are based on J. R. R. Tolkien's fantasy novel, The Hobbit, adapted for the screen by Jackson, Fran Walsh, Philippa Boyens and Guillermo del Toro. A large ensemble cast was featured in the series, which included Ian McKellen, Martin Freeman, Richard Armitage, Aidan Turner, Benedict Cumberbatch, Evangeline Lilly, Orlando Bloom, and Ryan Gage.

An Unexpected JourneyThe Hobbit: An Unexpected Journey was released in New Zealand on 12 December 2012. It was released in the United Kingdom on December 13 and in North America and Europe on December 14.An Unexpected Journey has won the "Technical Achievement" award by the Houston Film Critics Society, who also nominated it for "Best Original Song", the award for "Outstanding Virtual Cinematography" by the Visual Effects Society, the Best Hero award for Martin Freeman at the 2013 MTV Movie Awards and the Empire Awards for "Best Actor" and "Best Sci-Fi/Fantasy". Among others, the film has also received three Academy Award nominations, a nomination from the Washington D.C. Area Film Critics Association, four nominations from the Broadcast Film Critics Association, six nominations from the Visual Effects Society, and three nominations from the Phoenix Film Critics Society.

The Desolation of SmaugThe Hobbit: The Desolation of Smaug was released in  December 12. In North America, it was released on December 13, 2013.

The Battle of the Five ArmiesThe Hobbit: The Battle of the Five Armies'' was released on December 11, while in North America was released on December 17, 2014.

See also

 List of accolades received by The Lord of the Rings film series
 2012 in film
 2013 in film
 2014 in film

References

General

Specific

External links 

 
 
 

Hobbit
Middle-earth lists
List of accolades
Warner Bros. Discovery-related lists